Black from the Future is the fifth studio album by Brand Nubian member Grand Puba. It is his first album since the 2009 album Retroactive since beginning his solo career in 1992. It was released on April 15, 2016. It includes socially-charged and rhythmatical tracks such as the conscious single "The More Things Change." On the album, Grand Puba produced three of the twelve tracks, while Big Sproxx produced five tracks, PhD produced three tracks, and Vance Wright produced the other.

Track listing

"UDK" (3:12) (produced by Grand Puba)
"The More Things Change" (feat. Isis Aja) (3:57) (produced by PhD)
"Tap Out" (2:42) (produced by Big Sproxx)
"Original" (2:58)(feat. Isis Aja) (produced by Grand Puba)
"It's Over" (2:15) (produced by PhD)
"Think of U" (feat. Isis Aja) (3:23) (produced by Big Sproxx)
"Yard" (feat. Isis Aja) (3:24) (produced by Big Sproxx)
"Respect" (feat. Khadijah Muhammad) (3:15) (produced by Grand Puba)
"Be Mine" (2:09) (produced by Big Sproxx)
"Do the One" (3:01) (produced by Big Sproxx)
"Magic Man" (3:10)(feat. Isis Aja) (produced by Vance Wright)
"It's Been Awhile"  (3:15) (produced by PhD)

Personnel

 Jason Agel - mixing
 Isis Aja - featured artist
 Jeff Chenault - packaging
 Lulu Cohen - producer
 Willie Dixon - composer
 Jeremy Gerson - Product Manager
 Grand Puba - composer
 Khadijah Muhammad - Composer, featured artist
 PhD - composer, producer
 Big Sproxx - composer, producer
 Ian "PhD" Tait - Artwork
 Matty Trump - Mastering
 Matt Wein - Marketing Coordinator 
 Chuck Wilson - Executive Producer 
 Vance Wright - composer, producer

References

2016 albums
Grand Puba albums
E1 Music albums